Mike Collins (born December 13, 1960) is an American football coach and former player. He was the defensive coordinator at University of Louisiana at Monroe until unexpectedly stepping down on Sept. 3, 2020, just 10 days prior to ULM's first game of the season. He has formerly coached two different stints as defensive coordinator and linebackers coach at McNeese State University. Collins was named interim head football coach at Louisiana–Monroe during the 2002 season.

ULM announced that Collins would be the permanent hire for head coach at the end of the 2002 season, but four months into his tenure he resigned after an April 2003 arrest on suspicion of driving while intoxicated. He later fought the charge and won in court.

On May 15, 2013, Sam Houston State announced Mike Collins would replace Scott Stoker as Sam Houston's defensive coordinator.

On December 20, 2015, new Louisiana–Monroe coach Matt Viator announced that Collins would be returning to the Warhawks' staff as defensive coordinator.

Head coaching record

Notes

References

External links
 Louisiana–Monroe profile

1960 births
Living people
American football centers
Louisiana–Monroe Warhawks football coaches
Louisiana–Monroe Warhawks football players
LSU Tigers football coaches
McNeese Cowboys football coaches
Northwestern State Demons football coaches
High school football coaches in Arkansas
High school football coaches in Louisiana
High school football coaches in Texas
Sportspeople from Ruston, Louisiana